The 2022 Dutch Open, also known by its sponsored name Van Mossel Kia Dutch Open, was a professional tennis tournament played on clay courts. It was the third edition of the Challenger tournament which was part of the 2022 ATP Challenger Tour. It took place in Amersfoort, Netherlands between 11 and 17 July 2022.

Singles main draw entrants

Seeds

 1 Rankings are as of 27 June 2022.

Other entrants
The following players received wildcards into the singles main draw:
  Max Houkes
  Alexander Maarten Jong
  Deney Wassermann

The following players received entry into the singles main draw as alternates:
  Javier Barranco Cosano
  Robin Haase

The following players received entry from the qualifying draw:
  Adrian Andreev
  Arthur Fils
  Ivan Gakhov
  Martin Krumich
  Tristan Lamasine
  Luca Van Assche

The following players received entry as lucky losers:
  Oscar José Gutierrez
  Harold Mayot

Champions

Singles

 Tallon Griekspoor def.  Roberto Carballés Baena 6–1, 6–2.

Doubles

 Robin Haase /  Sem Verbeek def.  Nicolás Barrientos /  Miguel Ángel Reyes-Varela 6–4, 3–6, [10–7].

References

Dutch Open
2022 in Dutch tennis
July 2022 sports events in the Netherlands
Dutch Open (tennis)